Sadat Happy Anaku Ana (born 9 December 2000) is a Ugandan professional footballer who plays for Scottish club Dundee United, as a forward.

Club career
Anaku played in his native Uganda for Kampala Capital City Authority, scoring 22 goals in 67 games for the club before signing a two-year contact with Scottish club Dundee United in August 2022, following a successful trial.

International career
In September 2021 he represented a Ugandan select team on a regional tour, and in February 2022 he represented a Ugandan select team in an exhibition match in Spain.

Anaku has been called up by the Ugandan senior national team, but as of August 2022 had yet to play.

References

2000 births
Living people
Ugandan footballers
Kampala Capital City Authority FC players
Dundee United F.C. players
Association football forwards
Ugandan expatriate footballers
Ugandan expatriate sportspeople in Scotland
Expatriate footballers in Scotland
Scottish Professional Football League players